Eschata xanthocera is a moth in the family Crambidae. It was described by George Hampson in 1896. It is found in Sri Lanka.

Description
Its wingspan is about 38 mm. Forewings with somewhat produced and acute apex. In the male, the antennae is orange. Legs orange and fringed with whitish hair. Forewings with postmedial and submarginal lines almost obsolete. Cilia white with golden tips throughout.

References

Chiloini
Moths described in 1896